R338 road may refer to:
 R338 road (Ireland)
 R338 road (South Africa)